Cincinnati Center City Development Corporation (3CDC) is a private, non-profit real-estate development and finance organization focused on strategically revitalizing Cincinnati's downtown urban core in partnership with the City of Cincinnati and the Cincinnati corporate community. Its work is specifically focused on the central business district and in the Over-the-Rhine (OTR) neighborhood. The organization is widely credited with revitalizing OTR, which during the early 2000’s was considered one of the most dangerous neighborhoods in the United States. While the organization began as a full-service real estate developer, it has since branched out and become a significant event programmer in Cincinnati, producing over 1,000 events per year at the four civic spaces it manages: Fountain Square, Washington Park, Ziegler Park and Memorial Hall.

History
In July 2003, 3CDC was formed by former mayor of Cincinnati, Charlie Luken and other corporate community members. This was a result of a recommendation by a City of Cincinnati Economic Development Task Force. Most funds are gathered through corporate contributions. In 2004, 3CDC accepted responsibility for overseeing Cincinnati New Markets Fund and Cincinnati Equity Fund. As of May 2018, those funds total over $250 million and have resulted in over $1.3 billion invested in downtown and Over-the-Rhine real estate projects.

Controversy 
Some long-term residents of the Over-the-Rhine neighborhood have voiced concern that 3CDC does not sufficiently attend to the concerns of long-term residents of the neighborhood, which was formerly 80% African-American, and that gentrification caused by 3CDC's development is displacing the existing population and businesses.

On three occasions, the Cincinnati Board of Housing Appeals has accused 3CDC of "demolition by neglect" (a first-degree misdemeanor in Cincinnati) by allowing vacant buildings to be neglected until they require emergency demolition.

Projects
Fountain Square plaza and garage: October 2005 - October 2006
Washington Park: August 2010 - February 2011
Vine Street streetscape project: Summer 2009–Present
Over-the-Rhine: ongoing project redeveloping streets starting with Vine Street and Central Parkway

References

External links
 

Organizations based in Cincinnati
Non-profit corporations
Organizations established in 2003
2003 establishments in Ohio